Yvonne M. Lopez (born July 28, 1957) is an American Democratic Party politician. A resident of Perth Amboy, she has represented the 19th Legislative District in the New Jersey General Assembly since taking office on January 9, 2018. She initially had been in the private sector, having served in the Community Relations department of Wachovia Bank, for 20 years from 1987 to 2007, where she became a vice-president.

New Jersey Assembly 

Lopez ran and won in the 2017 election for John Wisniewski's seat, who relinquished it to run for Governor of New Jersey in the 2017 election.

Committees 
Environment and Solid Waste
Financial Institutions and Insurance
Oversight, Reform and Federal Relations
Transportation and Independent Authorities

District 19 
Each of the 40 districts in the New Jersey Legislature has one representative in the New Jersey Senate and two members in the New Jersey General Assembly. The representatives from the 19th District for the 2022—23 Legislative Session are:
Senator Joseph Vitale (D), 
Assemblyman Craig Coughlin (D), and 
Assemblyman Yvonne Lopez

Electoral history

New Jersey Assembly

References

External links
Legislative webpage

1957 births
Living people
Hispanic and Latino American state legislators in New Jersey
Hispanic and Latino American women in politics
Democratic Party members of the New Jersey General Assembly
Politicians from Perth Amboy, New Jersey
Rutgers University alumni
21st-century American politicians
21st-century American women